Geschwister-Scholl-Schule is the largest secondary school in the university town of Tübingen, Baden-Württemberg, Germany. It consists of a Hauptschule, a Realschule, and a Gymnasium.

History
The school was established in 1971 as the Gesamtschule Tübingen.

Name 
The name Geschwister-Scholl-Schule literally translates as Scholl Siblings School. Its namesakes are Hans Scholl and his sister Sophie Scholl, who were members of the White Rose, a student group in Nazi Germany who resisted Hitler and National Socialism. The white rose was hence incorporated into the school's logo.

Gymnasium 
The Gymnasium at Geschwister-Scholl-Schule is the largest section of the school with 850 students.

External links
 Geschwister-Scholl-Schule's official Website (German)

Schools in Baden-Württemberg
Education in Tübingen
Educational institutions established in 1971
Hans and Sophie Scholl